Serbian Democratic Party or Serb Democratic Party may refer to:

Serb Democratic Party (Bosnia and Herzegovina), major Serb nationalist party established in 1990 and based in Banja Luka, active in Republika Srpska and Bosnia and Herzegovina
Serb Democratic Party (Croatia), defunct Serb nationalist party in Croatia, established in 1990 and dissolved in 1995, formerly based in Knin
Serb Democratic Party (Serbia, 2011), minor Serb nationalist party established in 2011 and based in Novi Sad

See also
Democratic Serb Party (Montenegro)
Democratic Party (Serbia)
Democratic Party of Serbia
Democratic Party of Serbs in Macedonia